Philippe Lot (born 13 June 1967) is a French Olympic rower.

Career 
Lot represented France at the 1992 Summer Olympics in the coxed four where he came fifth. He won a gold medal at the 1993 World Rowing Championships in Račice with the men's four.

References

1967 births
Living people
French male rowers
World Rowing Championships medalists for France
Olympic rowers of France
Rowers at the 1992 Summer Olympics
Sportspeople from Nord (French department)
20th-century French people